Tony Roche and Judy Tegart were the defending champions. They lost in the final to Owen Davidson and Lesley Turner

Seeds
Champion seeds are indicated in bold text while text in italics indicates the round in which those seeds were eliminated. The top and bottom two seeded teams received byes into the second round.

Draw

Final

Top half

Bottom half

References 
 1967 Australian Championships Mixed Doubles Draw

1967 in Australian tennis
Mixed Doubles
1967